Il Giardino Armonico ("The Garden of Harmony") is an Italian ensemble well noted for its practice of Historically Informed Performance and founded in Milan in 1985 by Luca Pianca and Giovanni Antonini, primarily to play 17th- and 18th-century music on period instruments.

Il Giardino Armonico performs with soloists such as the mezzo-soprano Cecilia Bartoli, duo pianists Katia and Marielle Labèque, (Baroque) violinist Enrico Onofri, cellist Christophe Coin, and soprano Danielle de Niese. Its recordings have met with honors including the Gramophone and Grammy Awards.

Il Giardino Armonico performs both in concerts and in opera stage productions of works such as by Monteverdi, Handel, Pergolesi and Vivaldi. In 2014, the ensemble commenced a project aiming to perform and record all of Joseph Haydn's symphonies by 2032, the 300th anniversary of the composer's birth.

References

External links

Il Giardino Armonico Official site with biography of group

Il Giardino Armonico
Italian classical music groups
Musical groups established in 1985
Musical groups from Milan
1985 establishments in Italy